

The Agusta CP-110, also known as CVV P.110  or  Politecnico P.110, was a prototype Italian four-seat light aircraft first flown in 1951 that failed to attract interest from either civil or military operators, although it was evaluated by the Aeronautica Militare (Italian Air Force). Originally designed and built by the CVV - (Centro Volo a Vela del Politecnico di Milano), production aircraft were to have been built by Agusta, but for lack of interest.

Specifications

See also

References

External links

 luftfahrt-archiv.de

1950s Italian civil utility aircraft
Agusta aircraft
Aircraft first flown in 1951